Anıl Yüksel (born 19 May 1990) is a Dutch–born Turkish tennis player.

Yüksel has a career high ATP singles ranking of 492 achieved on 11 November 2016. He also has a career high ATP doubles ranking of 465, achieved on 30 July 2018. Yüksel has won 4 ITF doubles titles.
 
Yüksel has represented Turkey at Davis Cup, where he has a win–loss record of 4–3.

References

External links 
 
 
 

1990 births
Living people
Turkish male tennis players
Sportspeople from Venlo
Sportspeople from Istanbul
Competitors at the 2013 Mediterranean Games
Competitors at the 2018 Mediterranean Games
Mediterranean Games bronze medalists for Turkey
Mediterranean Games medalists in tennis